Telshe Yeshiva (Chicago) (or Telshe Chicago or Telz Chicago) is a Yeshiva (Jewish Talmudical and Rabbinical School) in Chicago, Illinois. In 1960, Rabbi Chaim Mordechai Katz, Rosh Yeshiva of the Telshe Yeshiva in Cleveland, Ohio, established Telshe Chicago as a branch of the Telshe Yeshiva (named after the Lithuanian town of Telšiai).

History

At the request of members of the Chicago Jewish Community who wanted a Lithuanian-style Yeshiva in their midst, Rabbi Chaim Mordechai Katz selected a group of exemplary students, led by Rabbis Avrohom Chaim Levin and Chaim Schmelczer, to open the Chicago branch. Rabbi Chaim Dov Keller joined them a year later.

Divisions

Mechina
The Mechina ("preparatory school") offers a four-year course for students of high school age in Talmud, Hebrew Bible, Prophets and Jewish law leading to acceptance in the yeshiva division. The Mechina incorporates the Telshe High School, which offers a full four-year senior high school general studies program accredited by the Illinois State Board of Education.

Yeshiva
The yeshiva (undergraduate division), offers a five-year intensive course of study in Talmud, Bible, Jewish law and ethics leading to a "First Talmudic Degree", equivalent to a B.A.

Graduate program
The kollel graduate school offers a six-year program to students who have completed the Yeshiva course, to research specific areas of Talmudic law and ethics culminating in a "Second Talmudic Degree", equivalent to a master's degree.

The Rabbinic Division
Telshe Chicago offers two two-year programs for students who have completed their undergraduate studies.

The "First Rabbinic Degree" - yoreh yoreh semicha ("ordination") encompasses the laws of kashrut ("dietary laws") and shechita ("ritual slaughter").
The "Second Rabbinic Degree" - yadin yadin semicha is offered to students who have completed their "First Rabbinic Degree" and encompasses study of the laws of finance, damages, contracts and other financial subjects as defined by the Shulkhan Arukh (Code of Jewish Law) and in Rabbinic literature.

Community Institute of Telshe Chicago (City Program)

The Community Institute of Telshe Chicago is an extension of Telshe Chicago servicing the community with adult Jewish education. Courses offered include Talmud, Mishna, Hebrew Bible, practical application of Jewish law, Jewish philosophy and selections from the works by Maimonides.

There are scheduled classes in the yeshiva, northern suburbs, and a Chavrusa Community Kollel Program that is held at Congregation Agudath Israel/Warsaw Bikur Cholim in Peterson Park.

See also 
 Hebrew Theological College:  Jewish seminary in Skokie
 Illinois Holocaust Museum and Education Center:  Museum in Skokie
 Spertus Institute:  Jewish American museum in Chicago

Lithuanian-American culture in Chicago
Orthodox yeshivas in the United States
Universities and colleges in Chicago
Educational institutions established in 1960
Orthodox Judaism in Chicago
Jewish day schools in Chicago
North Park, Chicago
Private high schools in Chicago
1960 establishments in Illinois
Seminaries and theological colleges in Illinois